Dmitry Vladimirovich Kovtun (25 September 1965 – 4 June 2022) was a Russian businessman and KGB agent who was also suspected to have murdered the ex-spy Alexander Litvinenko in London.

Early life and education
Kovtun was born into a military family in Moscow on 25 September 1965.  He attended the Moscow Higher Military Command School in the 1980s. Andrei Lugovoi was his childhood friend and classmate.

Career
After graduation, Kovtun and Lugovoi began to serve at the KGB's ninth directorate that was charged with the protection of top Kremlin officials. After the collapse of the USSR, they became involved in the security business. He was also a business consultant.

Alexander Litvinenko radiation investigation

Radiation investigation
Kovtun met ex-spy Alexander Litvinenko in London on several occasions, first in mid-October and later only hours before Litvinenko fell ill on 1 November. On 9 December 2006, German police report finding traces of radiation at Hamburg flat used by Kovtun. According to German investigators, the polonium traces were found on a couch where Kovtun is believed to have slept at his ex-wife's apartment in Hamburg (Altona-Ottensen) the night before he headed to London for a meeting with Litvinenko and according to British investigators, polonium traces were found on the airplanes in which Kovtun traveled between Moscow and London. Polonium traces were also found in Kovtun's car in Hamburg.

Both Russian and British investigators interviewed Kovtun. Furthermore, German detectives investigated Kovtun's suspected participation to plutonium smuggling into Germany. Germany dropped the case against Kovtun in November 2009.

Kovtun was hospitalised in Moscow with radiation poisoning at the beginning of December 2006. On 12 December 2006, he told Russia's Channel One TV that his "health was improving." Kovtun said that he had only one explanation for the presence of polonium: "It is that I brought it back from London, where I met Alexander Litvinenko on October 16, 17 and 18." British detectives, on the other hand, believe Litvinenko was not contaminated until the meeting on 1 November.

Various theories of Kovtun's involvement have been discussed in the media. One theory is he may have been the murderer or an accomplice  of one of the murderers of Alexander Litvinenko and mishandled the substance used, polonium-210.

Accusation
The Crown Prosecution Service accused Kovtun as being the second suspect of murdering Alexander Litvinenko based on the discovery of new evidence in 2011 and requested his extradition to England to stand trial in February 2012.

On 22 March 2015, Kovtun appeared on BBC News at Ten and announced that he would testify, by video-link, to the enquiry into Litvinenko's death. He told the BBC he had "heard a lot of statements which are easy to refute" and by participating he could "get access to the documents – including the secret material – so I can make my own conclusions".

Sanctions
On 9 January 2017, under the Magnitsky Act, the United States Treasury's Office of Foreign Assets Control updated its Specially Designated Nationals List and blacklisted Aleksandr I. Bastrykin, Andrei K. Lugovoi, Dmitri V. Kovtun, Stanislav Gordievsky, and Gennady Plaksin, which froze any of their assets held by American financial institutions or transactions with those institutions and banned their travelling to the United States.

Death
Kovtun died at a Moscow hospital on 4 June 2022, from COVID-19.

See also
Anna Politkovskaya
Mario Scaramella

References

1965 births
2022 deaths
Fugitives wanted by the United Kingdom
Businesspeople from Moscow
KGB officers
People sanctioned under the Magnitsky Act
Deaths from the COVID-19 pandemic in Russia